The Lithuanian Land Forces (LLF) form the backbone of the Lithuanian Armed Forces, capable of acting as an integral part of NATO forces. Lithuanian Land Forces consist of three brigades, the Engineer Battalion, and the National Defence Volunteers Division.

Structure

The main element of the Land Forces is a single mechanised infantry brigade, the Iron Wolf Mechanised Infantry Brigade. This is formed around three mechanized infantry battalions and an artillery battalion, all named after Lithuanian grand dukes as the tradition of the Lithuanian Armed Forces goes.

In addition to the formed infantry brigade, the Land Forces maintain a second brigade composed of three motorised infantry battalions and one artillery battalion; one of these is tasked to support operations both domestically and overseas; one is tasked primarily with the defence of territorial Lithuania. There is a third brigade, which is a mobilization brigade but in peace time is a training unit.

Juozas Vitkus Engineer Battalion is responsible for mine clearance, the construction of pontoon bridges, unexploded ordnance detonation tasks, underwater engineering, and participation in search and rescue operations. The Explosive Ordnance Disposal Platoon is ready to participate in international operations. Starting in 2008, the Lithuanian Armed Forces launched a 10-year-long project continuing mine cleaning on Lithuanian territory of explosives left after the First and Second World War, and in former Soviet military bases.

As an integral part of the Land Forces, the National Defence Volunteers have been developing since the beginning of the national movement for independence. The volunteers act smoothly together with the Allies during military operations and have been assigned new missions: to augment the regular forces, to deploy individual units and specific capabilities for international operations, to assist host nation support and to support the civilian authorities.

Units

With the reintroduction of conscription in 2015 the Lithuanian Land Force began an expansion of its main combat formations, which concluded in early 2017:

  Iron Wolf Mechanized Infantry Brigade, in Rukla:
 Headquarters and Headquarters Company, in Rukla
  , in Panevėžys
  , in Alytus
  , in Rukla
  , in Rukla
  General Romualdas Giedraitis Artillery Battalion, in Rukla with PzH2000 self-propelled howitzers
 Logistics Battalion, in Rukla
 Reconnaissance Company, in Rukla
 Signal Company, in Rukla
  , in Klaipėda: (activated 1 January 2016)
 Headquarters and Headquarters Company
  , in Klaipėda
  , in Tauragė
  Prince Margiris Motorized Infantry Battalion, in Radviliškis
  Brigadier general  Artillery Battalion, in Pajūris with M101 howitzers 
 Logistics Battalion
 Reconnaissance Company
 Signal Company, in Klaipėda
 Aukštaitija Light Infantry Brigade, in Vilnius: (activated 23 March 2017) 
 Headquarters and Headquarters Company
 Light Infantry (Reserve) Battalion
 Light Infantry (Reserve) Battalion
 Light Infantry (Reserve) Battalion
 Artillery (Reserve) Battalion with M101 howitzers
 Logistics Battalion
 Reconnaissance Company
 Signal Company
  , in Kaunas
 Lithuanian National Defence Volunteer Forces

The Aukštaitija Light Infantry Brigade is a reserve formation: during peacetime its staff teaches at the Lithuanian Armed Forces Training and Doctrine Command, while its four maneuver battalions are made up of reservists. The only active units are the brigade's reconnaissance company (which is composed of conscripts) and the headquarters, signal and logistic units (which are composed of professional soldiers). When called upon the brigade will field around 4,500 troops.

Equipment

In reforming the Armed Forces, most of the available attention and financial resources have been directed to the development of the Land Forces. Lithuania has been modernizing its armed forces since 1990s and by now nearly all equipment is compatible with the NATO standards. The current efforts focus on increasing the firepower, acquiring new equipment and armaments, enhancing their operational effectiveness and combat training. The standard service assault rifle of the Lithuanian Armed Forces is the Heckler & Koch G36 and the standard pistol is the Glock 17. The Lithuanian Land Forces are also equipped with machine guns, including the GPMG MG-3, the FN MAG, and the 12.7mm (.50 cal.) M2 Browning machine gun. They also employ the AT-4 anti-tank rockets and Carl Gustav anti-tank recoilless rifles, HK GMG high-velocity grenade launchers, and low-velocity AG-36 under-the-barrel grenade launchers, in addition to light and heavy mortars. The army also uses high-technology Lithuanian-made tactical automated commanding and controlling informational systems (TAVVIS).

Reserves

Lithuanian Land Forces are formed from professional military servicemen and volunteers. In 2008 the minister of national defence of Lithuania signed a law that ceased conscription in an effort to develop Lithuania's professional army. National defence is based on reserve forces and mobilisation forces. The new minister plans to increase national defence capabilities by making all males from 18 to 24 take 7 week military basic training. After that the person will be added to the military reserves.

The military conscription has been renewed in 2015 with a first draft of approx. 3000 draftees including volunteers, who will be assigned to military units starting from August 2015 and will complete a 9-month basic training. The updated law specifies that a draft of 3000 soldiers annually will continue at least until 2020, citing as the reason for renewed conscription the increased geopolitical risks in the region.

Notes

References

 Lithuanian Ministry of Defence site
Stefan Marx, 'Lithuania's Defence Structure,' Jane's Intelligence Review, September 1993, p. 407–409

Sources

External links 

 Map of the dislocation of the units of the Lithuanian Land Force in 2020